Yuliya Anatoliyevna Ivanova (born 9 September 1985 in Sosnogorsk) is a Russian cross-country skier. 
She competed at the FIS Nordic World Ski Championships 2011 in Oslo, and at the FIS Nordic World Ski Championships 2013 in Val di Fiemme.

Career
She competed at the 2014 Winter Olympics in Sochi, in 10 kilometre classical and 30 kilometre freestyle.

She was part of the Russian team that placed sixth in the relay, and part of the Russian team which placed sixth in the team sprint.

In December 2016, the International Ski Federation (FIS) provisionally suspended six Russian cross-country skiers linked to doping violations during the 2014 Winter Olympics, including Yuliya Ivanova. On 9 November 2017, she was officially disqualified from the 2014 Winter Olympics by the International Olympic Committee (IOC).

Cross-country skiing results
All results are sourced from the International Ski Federation (FIS).

Olympic Games

World Championships
1 medal – (1 bronze)

World Cup

Individual podiums
 3 podiums – (2 , 1 )

Team podiums
 3 podiums – (1 , 2 )

References

External links
 

1985 births
Living people
Cross-country skiers at the 2014 Winter Olympics
Russian female cross-country skiers
Tour de Ski skiers
Olympic cross-country skiers of Russia
Russian sportspeople in doping cases
Doping cases in cross-country skiing
Universiade medalists in cross-country skiing
People from the Komi Republic
Universiade silver medalists for Russia
Competitors at the 2009 Winter Universiade
Sportspeople from the Komi Republic